Giorgio Rossi (born 1 April 1948) is a retired Italian amateur track cyclist who won one silver and three bronze medals in the sprint and tandem events at the world championships of 1975–1980. He finished ninth in the tandem at the 1972 Summer Olympics and eighth in the sprint at the 1976 Games.

References

1948 births
Living people
Olympic cyclists of Italy
Cyclists at the 1972 Summer Olympics
Cyclists at the 1976 Summer Olympics
Italian male cyclists
Cyclists from Rome

Mediterranean Games gold medalists for Italy
Competitors at the 1975 Mediterranean Games
Mediterranean Games medalists in cycling